Biological carbon fixation or сarbon assimilation is the process by which inorganic carbon (particularly in the form of carbon dioxide) is converted to organic compounds by living organisms. The compounds are then used to store energy and as structure for other biomolecules. Carbon is primarily fixed through photosynthesis, but some organisms use a process called chemosynthesis in the absence of sunlight.

Organisms that grow by fixing carbon are called autotrophs, which include photoautotrophs (which use sunlight), and lithoautotrophs (which use inorganic oxidation). Heterotrophs are not themselves capable of carbon fixation but are able to grow by consuming the carbon fixed by autotrophs or other heterotrophs. "Fixed carbon", "reduced carbon", and "organic carbon" may all be used interchangeably to refer to various organic compounds. Chemosynthesis is carbon fixation driven by chemical energy, rather than from sunlight.  Sulfur- and hydrogen-oxidizing bacteria often use the Calvin cycle or the reductive citric acid cycle.

Net vs. gross CO2 fixation

The primary form of inorganic carbon that is fixed is carbon dioxide (CO2). It is estimated that approximately 258 billion tons of carbon dioxide are converted by photosynthesis annually.  The majority of the fixation occurs in terrestrial environments, especially the tropics.  The gross amount of carbon dioxide fixed is much larger since approximately 40% is consumed by respiration following photosynthesis.<ref>Raghavendra, A. S. (2003-01-01), Thomas, Brian (ed.), "PHOTOSYNTHESIS AND PARTITIONING | C3 Plants", Encyclopedia of Applied Plant Sciences, Oxford: Elsevier, pp. 673–680, </bdi>, retrieved 2021-03-21</ref>

Overview of pathways
Seven autotrophic carbon fixation pathways are known. The Calvin cycle fixes carbon in the chloroplasts of plants and algae, and in the cyanobacteria. It also fixes carbon in the anoxygenic photosynthesis in one type of Pseudomonadota called purple bacteria, and in some non-phototrophic Pseudomonadota.

Of the five other autotrophic pathways, two are known only in bacteria (the reductive citric acid cycle and the 3-hydroxypropionate cycle), two only in archaea (two variants of the 3-hydroxypropionate cycle), and one in both bacteria and archaea (the reductive acetyl CoA pathway).

List of pathways

Calvin cycle
The Calvin cycle accounts for 90% of biological carbon fixation.  Consuming ATP and NADPH, the Calvin cycle in plants accounts for the preponderance of carbon fixation on land. In algae and cyanobacteria, it accounts for the preponderance of carbon fixation in the oceans. The Calvin cycle converts carbon dioxide into sugar, as triose phosphate (TP), which is glyceraldehyde 3-phosphate (GAP) together with dihydroxyacetone phosphate (DHAP):
3 CO2  +  12 e−  +  12 H+  +  Pi   →   TP   +   4 H2O
An alternative perspective accounts for NADPH (source of e−) and ATP:

3 CO2  +  6 NADPH  +  6 H+  +  9 ATP  +  5 H2O   →   TP  +  6 NADP+  +  9 ADP  +  8 Pi

The formula for inorganic phosphate (Pi) is HOPO32− + 2H+. Formulas for triose and TP are C2H3O2-CH2OH and C2H3O2-CH2OPO32− + 2H+

Reverse Krebs cycle
The reverse Krebs cycle, also known as reverse TCA cycle (rTCA) or reductive citric acid cycle, is an alternative to the standard Calvin-Benson cycle for carbon fixation. It has been found in strict anaerobic or microaerobic bacteria (as Aquificales) and anaerobic archea. It was discovered by Evans, Buchanan and Arnon in 1966 working with the photosynthetic green sulfur bacterium Chlorobium limicola. In particular, it is one of the most used pathways in hydrothermal vents by the Campylobacterota. This feature is very important in oceans. Without it, there would be no primary production in aphotic environments, which would lead to habitats without life. So this kind of primary production is called "dark primary production".

The cycle involves the biosynthesis of acetyl-CoA from two molecules of CO2. The key steps of the reverse Krebs cycle are:

 Oxaloacetate to malate, using NADH + H+

Oxaloacetate + NADH/H+  -> Malate + NAD+

 Fumarate to succinate, catalyzed by an oxidoreductase, Fumarate reductase

Fumarate + FADH2  <=> Succinate + FAD

 Succinate to succinyl-CoA, an ATP dependent step

Succinate + ATP + CoA -> Succinyl-CoA + ADP + Pi

 Succinyl-CoA to alpha-ketoglutarate, using one molecule of CO2

Succinyl-CoA + CO2 + Fd{(red)} -> alpha-ketoglutarate + Fd{(ox)} 

 Alpha-ketoglutarate to isocitrate, using NADPH + H+ and another molecule of CO2

Alpha-ketoglutarate + CO2 + NAD(P)H/H+ -> Isocitrate + NAD(P)+

 Citrate converted into oxaloacetate and acetyl-CoA, this is an ATP dependent step and the key enzyme is the ATP citrate lyase

Citrate + ATP + CoA -> Oxaloacetate + Acetyl-CoA + ADP + Pi

This pathway is cyclic due to the regeneration of the oxaloacetate.

The bacteria Gammaproteobacteria and Riftia pachyptila switch from the Calvin-Benson cycle to the rTCA cycle in response to concentrations of H2S.

Reductive acetyl CoA pathway
The reductive acetyl CoA pathway (CoA) pathway, also known as the Wood-Ljungdahl pathway uses CO2 as electron acceptor and carbon source, and H2 as an electron donor to form acetic acid. This metabolism is wide spread within the phylum Bacillota, especially in the Clostridia.

The pathway is also used by methanogens, which are mainly Euryarchaeota, and several anaerobic chemolithoautotrophs, such as sulfate-reducing bacteria and archaea. It is probably performed also by the Brocadiales, an order of Planctomycetota that oxidize ammonia in anaerobic condition. Hydrogenotrophic methanogenesis, which is only found in certain archaea and accounts for 80% of global methanogenesis, is also based on the reductive acetyl CoA pathway.

The Carbon Monoxide Dehydrogenase/Acetyl-CoA Synthase is the oxygen-sensitive enzyme that permits the reduction of CO2 to CO and the synthesis of acetyl-CoA in several reactions.

One branch of this pathway, the methyl branch, is similar but non-homologous between bacteria and archaea. In this branch happens the reduction of CO2 to a methyl residue bound to a cofactor. The intermediates are formate for bacteria and formyl-methanofuran for archaea, and also the carriers, tetrahydrofolate and tetrahydropterins respectively in bacteria and archaea, are different, such as the enzymes forming the cofactor-bound methyl group.

Otherwise, the carbonyl branch is homologous between the two domains and consists of the reduction of another molecule of CO2 to a carbonyl residue bound to an enzyme, catalyzed by the CO dehydrogenase/acetyl-CoA synthase. This key enzyme is also the catalyst for the formation of acetyl-CoA starting from the products of the previous reactions, the methyl and the carbonyl residues.

This carbon fixation pathway requires only one molecule of ATP for the production of one molecule of pyruvate, which makes this process one of the main choice for chemolithoautotrophs limited in energy and living in anaerobic conditions.

3-Hydroxypropionate bicycle
The 3-Hydroxypropionate bicycle, also known as 3-HP/malyl-CoA cycle, discovered only in 1989, is utilized by green non-sulfur phototrophs of Chloroflexaceae family, including the maximum exponent of this family Chloroflexus auranticus by which this way was discovered and demonstrated. The 3-Hydroxipropionate bicycle is composed of two cycles and the name of this way comes from the 3-Hydroxyporopionate which corresponds to an intermediate characteristic of it.

The first cycle is a way of synthesis of glyoxylate. During this cycle, two equivalents of bicarbonate are fixed by the action of two enzymes: the Acetyl-CoA carboxylase catalyzes the carboxylation of the Acetyl-CoA to Malonyl-CoA and Propionyl-CoA carboxylase catalyses the carboxylation of propionyl-CoA to methylamalonyl-CoA. From this point a series of reactions lead to the formation of glyoxylate which will thus become part of the second cycle.

In the second cycle, glyoxylate is approximately one equivalent of propionyl-CoA forming methylamalonyl-CoA. This, in turn, is then converted through a series of reactions into citramalyl-CoA. The citramalyl-CoA is split into pyruvate and Acetyl-CoA thanks to the enzyme MMC lyase. At this point the pyruvate is released, while the Acetyl-CoA is reused and carboxylated again at Malonyl-CoA thus reconstituting the cycle.

A total of 19 reactions are involved in 3-hydroxypropionate bicycle and 13 multifunctional enzymes are used. The multifunctionality of these enzymes is an important feature of this pathway which thus allows the fixation of three bicarbonate molecules.

It is a very expensive pathway: 7 ATP molecules are used for the synthesis of the new pyruvate and 3 ATP for the phosphate triose.

An important characteristic of this cycle is that it allows the co-assimilation of numerous compounds making it suitable for the mixotrophic organisms.

Cycles related to the 3-hydroxypropionate cycle
A variant of the 3-hydroxypropionate cycle was found to operate in the aerobic extreme thermoacidophile archaeon Metallosphaera sedula. This pathway is called the 3-hydroxypropionate/4-hydroxybutyrate cycle.

Yet another variant of the 3-hydroxypropionate cycle is the dicarboxylate/4-hydroxybutyrate cycle.  It was discovered in anaerobic archaea.
It was proposed in 2008 for the hyperthermophile archeon Ignicoccus hospitalis.

enoyl-CoA carboxylases/reductases
 fixation is catalyzed by enoyl-CoA carboxylases/reductases.

Non-autotrophic pathways
Although no heterotrophs use carbon dioxide in biosynthesis, some carbon dioxide is incorporated in their metabolism. Notably pyruvate carboxylase consumes carbon dioxide (as bicarbonate ions) as part of gluconeogenesis, and carbon dioxide is consumed in various anaplerotic reactions. 

6-phosphogluconate dehydrogenase catalyzes the reductive carboxylation of ribulose 5-phosphate to 6-phosphogluconate in E. coli under elevated CO2 concentrations.

Carbon isotope discrimination
Some carboxylases, particularly RuBisCO, preferentially bind the lighter carbon stable isotope carbon-12 over the heavier carbon-13. This is known as carbon isotope discrimination and results in carbon-12 to carbon-13 ratios in the plant that are higher than in the free air. Measurement of this ratio is important in the evaluation of water use efficiency in plants, and also in assessing the possible or likely sources of carbon in global carbon cycle studies.

See also 

 Nitrogen fixation
Oxygen cycle

References

Further reading 

 
 
 
 
 
 

Photosynthesis
Carbon
Metabolic pathways
Atmospheric chemistry
Microbiology